Alibe Parsons (born 21 December 1945) is an actress who has worked in both film and television.

On television, she is best known for her regular role in the 1970s BBC drama Gangsters as Sarah Gant. She also had a recurring role in the science fiction series Space: 1999 and an appearance in Doctor Who in the 1986 serial Mindwarp. In 2021, she joined the cast of The Beaker Girls as Flo.

Other credits include: Coronation Street, Bergerac, Lovejoy, Holby City, The Bill and Waking the Dead.

Her film roles include: Game for Vultures (1979), The Bitch (1979), Biggles (1986) and Aliens (1986).

References

External links
 

1945 births
British actresses
British film actresses
British television actresses
Living people